Eric Herman (born October 5, 1989) is a former American football offensive guard. He was drafted by the New York Giants in the seventh round of the 2013 NFL Draft. He played college football at Ohio. Married to Leah Herman (Petrovich)

Professional career

New York Giants
On April 27, 2013, he was selected by the New York Giants in the seventh round, 225 overall pick of the 2013 NFL Draft.  On August 8, 2014, Herman was suspended for violating the NFL policy on performance-enhancing substances. On September 19, 2014 Eric Herman was waived. On September 22, 2014, he was signed to the practice squad. On September 1, 2015, he was waived by the Giants.

Baltimore Ravens
On December 17, 2015, Herman was signed by to the Baltimore Ravens practice squad.

Indianapolis Colts
On August 21, 2016, Herman was signed by the Colts. On August 28, 2016, Herman was waived by the Colts.

References

External links
Ohio Bobcats bio
Giants News and Blogs

1989 births
Living people
New York Giants players
Baltimore Ravens players
Indianapolis Colts players
People from Oregon, Ohio
Players of American football from Ohio
Ohio Bobcats football players
American football offensive guards